Ferdinand Malaisé, after 1862 Ritter Ferdinand von Malaisé (23 February 1806, Linz on the Rhine, Germany – 29 June 1892, Munich, Germany). Knight of the Order of St. Joseph of Tuscany (III Class), the Iron Crown of Austria (II Class with Laurels) and the Bavarian Order of Merit (III Class), Major General, 1st Royal Bavarian Field Artillery Brigade, Professor of Mathematics, Royal Bavarian Cadet Corps and tutor to Ludwig III, the last King of Bavaria.

Biography 
Ferdinand was the son of Christophe Malaisé (10 December 1773, St Menges, France – 25 April 1852, München, Germany) and Magdalena Stephani (17 October 1769, Mainz, Germany – 12 January 1821, Rheinzabern, Germany). Christoph was employed by the Rhine Customs Union (Rheinschifffahrts-Octroi), formed in 1804 by the French and Holy Roman Empires to facilitate the free movement of goods on the Rhine. In 1821, Christoph was redeployed from his post in Neuburg am Rhein to Germersheim and on the journey his wife Magdalena died from a haemorrhage.

In 1822 at the age of 16, Ferdinand joined the Bavarian Army in Landau. In 1825 he was posted to Munich where in 1830 he married Adelheid Wibmer, the daughter of Sebastian Alois Wibmer, a court official. They had three sons and four daughters. After being promoted to captain, Ferdinand became tutor to Ludwig III, the last King of Bavaria and his brother Prinz Leopold. After further promotions in 1853 and 1861, Ferdinand was awarded the Royal Bavarian Order of Merit in 1862. In 1870 he was appointed Commander, 1st Royal Bavarian Field Artillery Brigade and director of Field Artillery, 1st Royal Bavarian Corps during the Franco-Prussian War (19 July 1870 – 10 May 1871). In 1887 he was enrolled in the nobility of Bavaria as Ritter. He died in June 1892 and is buried in the Alte Südfriedhof in München, Germany.

There is no direct connection to the de la Malaise family, seigneurs in Lavoir in the 16th century.

References 
Wappenbuch des gesammten Adels des Königreichs Bayern, Nürnberg, J.A. Tyroff, 1870.
Genealogisches Handbuch des in Bayern immatrikulierten Adels, Band XX, Degener; 1994' 
Deutsches Geschlechterbuch Bd 128, S. 64
Ferdinand Malaisé: Theoretisch-practischer Unterricht im Rechnen: zunächst für die niederen Classen der Regimentsschulen der Königl. Bayer. Infanterie und Cavalerie und zum Gebrauche jener, die sich über die Gründe beim Rechnen selbst unterrichten wollen. Im Verlage des Verfassers, München 1842. (Text at Google Books)

Footnotes

1806 births
1892 deaths
People from Neuwied (district)
19th-century German mathematicians
Bavarian generals
German military personnel of the Franco-Prussian War
German untitled nobility
Military personnel from Rhineland-Palatinate